Thake v Maurice [1986] QB 644 is an English contract law case, concerning the standard of care that must be exercised by surgeons in performing operations.

Facts
Mr Thake was a railway guard and they were not financially comfortable with five children already (two grown up), living in a three-bedroom council house. Mrs Thake wanted to be sterilised, but the NHS waiting list was long and they could not afford to go private. Their doctor suggested Mr Thake have a vasectomy and arranged for them to see Mr Maurice. He did not advise Mrs Thake that there was a small chance that after a vasectomy there could be recanalisation and Mr Thake would become fertile again. Mrs Thake ignored the signs of pregnancy because she thought it had worked, and then only realised when she was five months pregnant. She wanted an abortion, but it was too late. A healthy child was born called Samantha. They sued in contract and tort for damages.

Judgment
The Court of Appeal held that a normal, reasonable person knows that medical operations are not always successful, and that simply by promising to do an operation, there is no promise for success. Speaking about what an ordinary person would think, Nourse LJ said "it does seem to me to be reasonable to credit him with the more general knowledge that in medical science all things, or nearly all things are uncertain." All agreed that as a matter of tort, failure to warn about a small risk of failure amounted to a breach of the duty of care between surgeon and patient. The measure of tort damages were less than potential contract damages of £2500, being only £1500 to take account of the fact that she did not have the pain of an abortion. But there would be no damages for breach of contract, to put the patient in the position as if the contract had been successful, or in other words, to reimburse for the expenses of bringing up the child.

Kerr LJ concluded his judgment as follows. He referred to Lord Denning MR in Greaves & Co (Contractors) Ltd v Baynham Meikle & Partners when he said, “The surgeon does not warrant that he will cure the patient.”

Neill LJ said,

So stressing that the operation was ‘irreversible’ did not amount to giving a guarantee that it would work, no binding promise.

See also
Interpreting contracts in English law

Notes

References
Hugh Collins, The Law of Contract (4th edn CUP, Cambridge 2003) 338
HG Bishop, WD Beale and MP Furmston, Contract: Cases and Materials (5th edn OUP, Oxford 2007) 330

English interpretation case law
English implied terms case law
Court of Appeal (England and Wales) cases
1986 in case law
1986 in British law